Zotikov Glacier is a tributary glacier, 8 miles (13 km) long, flowing northeast from Mount Fisher in the Prince Olav Mountains and entering Liv Glacier just east of Hardiman Peak. Named by Advisory Committee on Antarctic Names (US-ACAN) for Dr. Igor Zotikov, Soviet glaciologist and exchange scientist to the United States Antarctic Research Program (USARP) at McMurdo Station in 1965.

Glaciers of Dufek Coast